Sanawad is a city in the Khargone district in the Indian state of Madhya Pradesh. It is a popular center for the trade of cotton and wheat. Nearby cities include Barwaha, Khargone, Khandwa and Indore. In the Khargone district Sanawad is the third biggest city after Khargone and Barwaha.

It is known for religious unity because of shitlamata mandir and piranpir dargah

Demographics

Sanawad is divided into 18 wards for which elections are held every 5 years. Sanawad has population of 51000 of which 26010 are males while 24990 are females as per a report released by Census India 2022

Population of children aged 0–6 is 6120 which is 12.47% of total population of Sanawad. In Sanawad, Female Sex Ratio is of 947 against a state average of 931. Moreover, Child Sex Ratio in Sanawad is around 914 compared to Madhya Pradesh state average of 918. Literacy rate of Sanawad city is 55.7% lower than a state average of 69.32%. In Sanawad, Male literacy is around 45.7% while female literacy rate is 67.9%.

Sanawad has total administration over 10000 houses to which it supplies basic amenities like water and sewerage. It is also authorized to build roads within Municipality limits and impose taxes on properties coming under its jurisdiction.

Caste Factor 
Schedule Caste (SC) constitutes 8.93% while Schedule Tribe (ST) were 7.55% of total population in Sanawad.

Work Profile 
Out of total population, 38740 were engaged in work or business activity. Of this 30176 were males while 8564 were females. In census survey, worker is defined as person who does business, job, service, and cultivator and labour activity. Of total 38740 working population, 89.49% were engaged in Main Work while 10.51% of total workers were engaged in Marginal Work.

Holkar (Rajamata Devi Ahilya Bai Holkar's) capital Maheshwer where various forts and historical monuments could be visited is 60 km from the town.

Education

Primary and Secondary 

 Anjuman Islam Gulsanabad Sanawad mp
 Govt. Boys Higher Secondary School
 Jawahar Navodaya vidyalaya sanawad juna pani
 Govt. Girls Higher Secondary School
 Shree Rewa Gurjar H. S.School
Azolla International School
 R. D. Jain Montessori School
 M. D. Jain H S School
 Vimala Convent H.S. School
Indian Public School
 Saraswati Vidhya Mandir School
 Drashti Public School
 Priyansh Academy
 Gurukul School
 Parents' Pride International School
 Vasundhara Vidhyapeeth
 Abhigyan Girls school
 Shree Rewa Gurjar Bal Niketan
 Geeta Devi Agrawal Public Higher S. School
 Maa Fatima International Academy
 Shri Sai International School Sanawad
 Sandipani Academy Sanawad
 Total Educational Academy Sanawad
 Uddan Academy Sanawad
 Shikhar Academy of education sanawad
 Government middle school lohari sanawad
 Government primary school morghadi Sanawad
 Avs school sanawad
 The Nerula Heights School sanawad
 Abhigyaan international School of intelligence sanawad
 Vasundara vidhyapith school sanawad
 Nirmal vidhyapith school sanawad
 Toppers Tample school sanawad
 G P school rupkheda sanawad
 sant singaji public school sanawad
 Shri kanwartara public higher secondary school sanawad
 Brittish institution of English classes sanawad
 Emerald Heights International Academy Sanawad
 The Future Foundation School Badud sanawad

Universities and Colleges 
 Government Arts and Commerce college Sanawad
 Shree reva gurjar bal niketan college sanawad
 Government Polytechnic College, Sanawad
 Government College for Commerce and Science
 Private College of Science
 Ravindra Nath Tagore institute of science and Professional Studies Morghadi
 R N T College

Economy 

The economy is primarily based on agriculture and trading. The main crops grown are cotton, chili, wheat and soybean.

History 

Sanawad is located on the banks of bankuvar (bakud) river and sacred river narmada is 5 km from sanawad .Pilgrims can reach famous Jyotirling Omkareshwar through Sanawad which is just 12 km from here.

Sanawad was home to freedom fighters Brij Mohan Sharma (also known as Birju Seth), Kamal Chand Jain (or Master Saab) and Jagdeesh Vidyarthi; all of whom were active in opposing British rule. The Misa bandhu is Lala Jivandas Bansal.

Town is around 10 km from Raverkhedi village where Bajirao spent his last time and died.

Culture 

Sanawad has cultural sites such as the Jama Masjid , Hussaini Masjid, Namokar Dham Jain temple garden near the Jain temple Podumpuram , Digambar Jain Temple, Gurudwara, mata mandir, hanuman mandir, or many other cultural sites are there in Sanawad. The other cultural site is known all over india is Omkareshwar jyotirling which is over 12  km between Sanawad to Omkareshwar. 

From last 118 years, a fair named "Piran pir dargha and sitlamata" has been organized here in the month of December.
Another important cultural festival is eid, Moharam, ramnavmi, gurunanak jaynti, Gangour which celebrated in the several month in entire Nimad area and in the world. 

Sanawad is also home to the contemporary artist and writer, Parimal Chahande. He has been crucial in making it a culturally rich and progressive city. Known for his Instagram stories and portrait paintings, he's a proud alumni of Vimala Convent H S School.

Transport 
Sanawad city is situated between other large cities and is well connected with local bus routes.

Rail
Sanawad has a large Railway Station called Sanawad Railway Station. It has 4 platforms, with routes connecting Akola to Indore.

Air
The closest airport to Sanawad is Indore Devi Ahilya Bai International Airport, located 70 km away.

References 

Cities and towns in Khargone district
Tourist attractions in Khargone district